Thomas Calloway Lea III (July 11, 1907 – January 29, 2001) was an American muralist, illustrator, artist, war correspondent, novelist, and historian. The bulk of his art and literary works were about Texas, north-central Mexico, and his World War II experience in the South Pacific and Asia. Two of his most popular novels, The Brave Bulls and The Wonderful Country, are widely considered to be classics of southwestern American literature.

Early life and education
Lea was born on July 11, 1907, in El Paso, Texas, to Thomas Calloway Lea Jr. and Zola May (née Utt). From 1915 to 1917, his father was mayor of El Paso. As mayor, his father made a public declaration that he would arrest Pancho Villa if he dared enter El Paso, after Villa raided Columbus, New Mexico on March 9, 1916. Villa then responded by offering a thousand pesos gold bounty on Lea. For six months Tom and his brother Joe had to have a police escort to and from school, and there was a 24-hour guard on the house.

He graduated from El Paso High School in 1924. From 1924 to 1926 he attended the Art Institute of Chicago and then apprenticed and assisted John W. Norton, a Chicago muralist, from 1927 to 1932.

In 1927, he wed Nancy June Taylor, a fellow art student. In 1930 Norton suggested that Tom take an art tour of Europe to study the masters. He and Nancy went to Paris and saw an exhibit of Eugène Delacroix at the Louvre, and Delacroix was his "favorite". Next they traveled to Florence, Orvieto, Rome, Capri. Then, after a four-month tour, it was back to Le Havre to catch the SS Ile de France.

After the tour of Italy they moved to Santa Fe to be with other artists and be in the Southwest. When Nancy became ill (a botched appendectomy) they moved to El Paso, and Lea found work from the New Deal art projects.

Career 

Lea won the Section of Painting and Sculpture competition for a mural commission in the United States Post Office Department Building (now the William Jefferson Clinton Federal Building) in Washington, D.C., called The Nesters. His other murals included the post offices in Odessa, Texas (Stampede), Pleasant Hill, Missouri (Back Home, April 1865), and Seymour, Texas (Comanches). In 1936, his wife (in April), grandmother (in June), and his mother (in December), all died in that year.

In 1937 he started doing illustration work, and this led to a partnership with a friend of his father, author J. Frank Dobie. Dobie wrote about the rough life of settling the Texas frontier and Lea's illustrations are mostly of cowboys and the wild Texas landscapes. While painting a mural in El Paso Federal Courthouse (Pass of the North), he met and married his second wife, Sarah Catherine Beane (née Dighton), in July 1938. Sarah had come from Monticello, Illinois, to El Paso to visit friends. Sarah had a son, James (Jim), from a previous marriage whom Lea adopted. While painting his courthouse mural, Lea also met artist José Cisneros and they were able to connect as friends and business contacts. That same year his started his lifelong partnership with Carl Hertzog (Jean Carl Hertzog Sr.), an El Paso book designer and typographer. 1937–1938 would prove to be the antithesis of 1936, providing Lea with three lifelong partners and friends.

In 1940 he applied for and won Rosenwald Fellowship, but by the end of the summer of 1941, he got a telegram from LIFE asking him to go to sea with the United States Navy on a North Atlantic Patrol. In the fall of 1941, he decided to paint for LIFE as war artist and correspondent aboard a destroyer. He traveled all over the world with the United States military from 1941 to 1945. This included: China, Great Britain, Italy, India, North Africa, North Atlantic, the Middle East, and the Western Pacific. He went on deployment with the aircraft carrier USS Hornet in the Pacific Ocean in 1942, where he met the famous Army Air Corps pilot Jimmy Doolittle. Lea was on board the Hornet (September 15, 1942) when the USS Wasp was sunk by torpedoes from a Japanese submarine. He painted several pictures of the sinking of the Wasp. In 1943, during his visit to China, he met Theodore H. White, and he painted the portraits of Generalissimo Chiang Kai-shek and his wife, Soong Mei-ling; and General Claire Lee Chennault, leader of the Flying Tigers.

It was during his time in the western Pacific in 1944 as a combat correspondent with the United States 1st Marine Division during the invasion of the tiny island of Peleliu that he would really make a name for himself among the readers of LIFE. "My work there consisted of trying to keep from getting killed and trying to memorize what I saw and felt," Lea says. His vivid, realistic, images of the beach landing, and Battle of Peleliu, would impact both readers and himself. The Price and That 2,000 Yard Stare would become among his most famous works. (1,794 Americans died in a two-month period in what many call the war's most controversial battle, due to its questionable strategic value and high death toll.)

In 1947 Lea finished a graphite sketch on kraft paper of his wife called Study for Sarah in the Summertime. He had started the sketch two years earlier, about six months after he got home from the war. The life size work (71" × 30¼") was based on a photograph, taken of Sarah in the backyard of their home at 1520 Raynolds Boulevard in El Paso, that he had carried in his wallet throughout the war. An oil painting, Sarah in the Summertime (67" × 32"), was then done from the sketch. He spent longer on this combined work than any other painting.

After finishing his last novel, The Hands of Cantu (an account of horse training in 16th-century Nueva Vizcaya) in 1964, Lea traveled to Boston to meet with his publishers, Little, Brown and Company. He told them that he wasn't interested in another novel, so they suggested a book about his pictures. This 1968 work, A Picture Gallery, was his "autobiography", writing of why and when he did his paintings. Working on A Picture Gallery would lead him to once again focus on painting and turn away from working on literature. Right before finishing this work, Baylor University paid tribute to his writing by bestowing him, and his long-time friend Carl Hertzog, with an honorary doctorate's in literature. The El Paso Museum of Art established its Tom Lea Gallery in 1996, and in 1997 he was honored as a Fellow in the Texas State Historical Association. President George W. Bush had Lea's painting Rio Grande displayed in the Oval Office.

Lea died in El Paso on January 29, 2001, at the age of 93.

Awards

Lifetime achievement
 1967: Honorary doctorate – Baylor University
 1970: Honorary doctorate – Southern Methodist University
 1971: Distinguished Public Service Award – United States Navy
 1975: Hall of Honor – El Paso County Historical Society
 1981: Lon Tinkle Award –  Texas Institute of Letters
 1990: Ima Hogg Historical Achievement Award
 : Colonel John W. Thomason Jr. Award for Artistic Achievement – United States Marine Corps
 1995: Hall of Great Westerners – National Cowboy & Western Heritage Museum
 2007: Tom Lea Centennial Celebration – United States Congress
: S. Res. 267 (Hutchison Resolution) – U.S. Senate July 2007 as "Tom Lea Month"
: H. Res. 519 – U.S. House of Representatives

Literature
 1992: Owen Wister Award – Western Writers of America

Art works

Public murals
State of Texas Centennial Commission, Federal Art Project (FAP) for the Works Progress Administration (WPA) and Public Works of Art Project for the United States Department of the Treasury.
"Illinois Heritage Series" (4 murals; 8' H. × W. 12' each) – Calumet Park Field House, Chicago, Illinois, 1927–28
Native-American Ceremony
Father Jacques Marquette and Louis Joliet
Native-American Hunting Party Returning Home
Native-Americans and Fur Traders
(These murals were restored in 2005 by The Chicago Park District and The Chicago Conservation Center.)
South Park Commission Building (auditorium), Gage Park, Chicago, Illinois, 1931
Hall of State, Texas State Fair Grounds, Dallas, Texas, 1935
The Nesters, – Ariel Rios Federal Building, 1937, mural (lost)
(Environmental Protection Agency; formerly Post Office Department Building & Benjamin Franklin Post Office)
Pass of the North, – El Paso Federal Courthouse, 1938, oil on canvas
Back Home: April 1865, – U.S. Post Office – Pleasant Hill, Missouri, 1939, oil on canvas
Stampede, – U.S. Post Office – Odessa, Texas, 1940, oil on canvas
Comanches, – U.S. Post Office – Seymour, Texas, 1942, oil on canvas
Conquistadors, – New Mexico State University, College Library, Mesilla Park, New Mexico (PWAP funding)
Southwest, – El Paso Public Library, El Paso, Texas, 1954, (donated work)

Paintings
 That 2,000 Yard Stare, – United States Army Center of Military History, Fort Lesley J. McNair, Washington, D.C., – 1944, oil on canvas
(This painting defined the term "thousand yard stare" in culture.)
 Rio Grande, – Oval Office – White House, Washington D.C., – 1954, oil on canvas
(since 2001; on loan to George W. and Laura Bush from the El Paso Museum of Art)
 Southwest, Study for, – American Art Museum, Smithsonian, Washington, D.C., – 1956. Oil on canvas, 10 × 32 in. (Frame: 19½ × 41¼ × 2)
(This is a scale study of the mural, Southwest, at the El Paso Public Library.)

Major exhibitions
 1948: Dallas Museum of Art – Dallas, Texas, – "Drawings and Illustrations" (February 8 March 7)
 1948: Dallas Museum of Art – Dallas, Texas, – "Paintings/Western Beef Cattle" (October 7, 1950-January 14)
 1961: Fort Worth Art Center – Fort Worth, Texas
 1963: El Paso Museum of Art – El Paso, Texas
 1969: Institute of Texan Cultures – San Antonio, Texas
 1971: El Paso Museum of Art – El Paso, Texas
 1994: El Paso Museum of Art – El Paso, Texas
 2015: Bullock Texas State History Museum – Austin, Texas
 2015: National Museum of the Pacific War –  Fredericksburg, Texas 
 2016: National WWII Museum – New Orleans, Louisiana

Permanent collections
 Austin, Texas:
 The Tom Lea Collections – Harry Ransom Humanities Research Center at the University of Texas at Austin,
 Blanton Museum of Art
 Dallas, Texas:
 Dallas Museum of Art
 El Paso, Texas:
 Tom Lea Gallery – El Paso Museum of Art
 Tom Lea Papers – University Library—Special Collections at the University of Texas at El Paso
 Tom Lea – Adair Margo Gallery
 Tom Lea – El Paso County Historical Society
 Laramie, Wyoming:
 University of Wyoming Art Museum
 Santa Fe, New Mexico:
 New Mexico Museum of Art

Bibliography

Works by

Illustrative works
1939: Dobie, J. Frank (author). – Apache Gold and Yaqui Silver. – Boston: Little, Brown and Company. – 
1984: – Austin, Texas: University of Texas Press. – 
1941: Dobie, J. Frank (author). – The Longhorns. – Boston: Little, Brown and Company. – 
1980: – Austin, Texas: University of Texas Press. – 
1946: Calendar of Twelve Travelers through the Pass of the North. – El Paso: Carl Hertzog. – 
1981: – El Paso, Texas: El Paso Electric Company. –

Non-fiction works with illustrations
1945: Peleliu Landing. – El Paso: Carl Hertzog. – 
1949: Bullfight Manual for Spectators. – Ciudad Juárez, Mexico: Plaza de Toros. – 
1957: – El Paso, Texas: Carl Hertzog. – 
1957: The King Ranch. – with Richard King. – Boston: Little, Brown and Company. – 
Kingsville, Texas: Printed for the King Ranch by Carl Hertzog. – 
1968: Tom Lea, A Picture Gallery: Paintings and Drawings. – Boston: Little, Brown and Company. –  (autobiography)
1974: In the Crucible of the Sun. – Kingsville, Texas: King Ranch. – 
1998: Battle Stations: A Grizzly from the Coral Sea, Peleliu Landing. – Dallas: Still Point Press. –

Fiction works with illustrations
1949: The Brave Bulls, A Novel. – Boston: Little, Brown and Company. – 
2002: – Austin, Texas: University of Texas Press. – 
1952: The Wonderful Country, A Novel. – Boston: Little, Brown and Company. – 
2002: – Fort Worth, Texas: TCU Press. – 
1960: The Primal Yoke, A Novel. – Boston: Little, Brown and Company. – 
1964: The Hands of Cantú. – Boston: Little, Brown and Company. –

Works about
Lea, Tom (illustrations), and the Fort Worth Art Center, (1961). – Tom Lea. – Fort Worth, Texas: Fort Worth Art Center. – 
Lea, Tom (illustrations and interviews), Rebecca McDowell Craver and Adair Margo, (1995). – Tom Lea: An Oral History. – El Paso, Texas: Texas Western Press. – 
Lea, Tom (illustrations), and Kathleen G Hjerter, (1989). – The Art of Tom Lea. – College Station, Texas: Texas A & M University Press. – 
2003: "A Memorial Edition". – College Station: Texas A&M University Press. – 
Lea, Tom (illustrations), and Brendan M Greeley, (2008). – The Two Thousand Yard Stare: Tom Lea's World War II. – College Station, Texas: Texas A&M University Press. –

Magazine articles
In 2007, Texas author Lou Halsell Rodenberger received the Stirrup Award for best article in Roundup, a publication of Western Writers of America, for her article entitled "Tom Lea, Novelist: The Eyes of an Artist, the Ears of a Writer."

References

External links

 The Tom Lea Collection – Harry Ransom Center – University of Texas at Austin
 Tom Lea- Legendary Texas Artist & Author – TomLea.com

 
1907 births
2001 deaths
20th-century American painters
American male painters
American illustrators
American male journalists
20th-century American journalists
American history painters
American muralists
People from El Paso, Texas
School of the Art Institute of Chicago alumni
Western (genre) writers
Novelists from Texas
American war correspondents of World War II
Burials at Texas State Cemetery
20th-century American novelists
Painters from Texas
20th-century American historians
American male non-fiction writers
American war artists
World War II artists
American male novelists
Section of Painting and Sculpture artists
Public Works of Art Project artists
Federal Art Project artists
20th-century American male writers
Historians from Texas